The 2nd Maintenance Battalion is a battalion of the United States Marine Corps that provides intermediate-level maintenance for the II Marine Expeditionary Force's tactical ordnance, engineer, motor transport, communications electronics and general support ground equipment. They are based out of Marine Corps Base Camp Lejeune, North Carolina and fall under the command of 2nd Marine Logistics Group.

Subordinate units
 Headquarters And Service Company (H&S Co)
 Electronic Maintenance Company (ELMACO)
 Engineer Maintenance Company (EMC)
 General Support Maintenance Company (GSM Co )
 Ordnance Maintenance Company (OMC)
 Motor Transportation Maintenance Company (MTM Co)
 Combat Logistics Company 23 (CLC-23) (MCAS Beaufort)

Mission
To provide direct and general support, intermediate (2d through 4th echelon)
maintenance support for Marine Corps furnished tactical ordnance, engineer, motor,
communications-electronics and general support equipment of II MEF. To provide
reparable support to include stock, store and fiscal accounting for normal accounting for
normal and low-density reparables.

History
Battalion Commanding Officers

• 2022-Present LtCol Greg Duesterhaus

• 2020-2022 LtCol Christina Henry

• 2018-2020 LtCol Kate Murray

• 2016-2018 LtCol Erik Smith

Battalion Sergeants Major
 2022-Present SgtMaj Jonathan Carranza
 2021-2022 SgtMaj Joseph Sorgie
 2020-2021 SgtMaj Joe Wilborn
 2017-2020 SgtMaj Charles Peoples

The 2nd Maintenance Battalion (2nd Maint Bn) previously fell under the command of Combat Logistics Regiment 25 (CLR-25), as a subordinate unit of 2d MLG.  In 2020, CLR-25 was dissolved, and 2nd Maint Bn now falls directly under 2d MLG.

See also

History of the United States Marine Corps
List of United States Marine Corps battalions

References

 
 

Maint2